Nezelof syndrome is an autosomal recessive congenital immunodeficiency condition due to underdevelopment of the thymus. The defect is a type of purine nucleoside phosphorylase deficiency with inactive phosphorylase, this results in an accumulation of deoxy-GTP which inhibits ribonucleotide reductase.  Ribonucleotide reductase catalyzes the formation of deoxyribonucleotides from ribonucleotides, thus, DNA replication is inhibited.

Symptoms and signs
This condition causes severe infections. it is characterized by elevated immunoglobulins that function poorly.
Other symptoms are:
 Bronchiectasis
 Hepatosplenomegaly
 Pyoderma
 Emphysema
 Diarrhea

Cause
Genetically speaking, Nezelof syndrome is autosomal recessive. the condition is thought to be a variation of severe combined immunodeficiency (SCID). However, the precise cause of Nezelof syndrome remains uncertain

Mechanism
In the mechanism of this condition, one first finds that the normal function of the thymus has it being important in T-cell development and release into the body's blood circulation Hassal's corpuscles absence in thymus(atrophy) has an effect on T-cells.

Diagnosis

The diagnosis of Nezelof syndrome will indicate a deficiency of T-cells, additionally in ascertaining the condition the following is done:
Blood test (B-cells will be normal)
X-ray of thymus (atrophy present)

Differential diagnosis
The differential diagnosis for this condition consists of acquired immune deficiency syndrome and severe combined immunodeficiency syndrome

Treatment

In terms of treatment for individuals with Nezelof syndrome, which was first  characterized in 1964, includes the following(how effective bone marrow transplant is uncertain) :
 Antimicrobial therapy
 IV immunoglobulin
 Bone marrow transplantation
 Thymus transplantation
 Thymus factors

See also 
 List of radiographic findings associated with cutaneous conditions

References

Further reading

External links 
 PubMed

Immunodeficiency
Noninfectious immunodeficiency-related cutaneous conditions
Autosomal recessive disorders